James Alexander Lovat-Fraser (16 March 1868 – 18 March 1938) was a British Labour Party and then National Labour politician. He sat in the House of Commons from 1929 to 1938.

He unsuccessfully contested Llandaff and Barry at the 1922 general election,
and Bristol Central at the 1924 general election.
He was elected at the 1929 general election as the Member of Parliament (MP) for the Lichfield division of Staffordshire.
When the Labour Party split in 1931 over the budget, Lovat-Fraser was one of the minority of Labour MPs who supported the Prime Minister Ramsay MacDonald in forming a National Government with Conservative Party support.
He was re-elected as a National Labour candidate in 1931
and in 1935
and held the seat until his death in March 1938, aged 70.

References

External links 
 

1868 births
1938 deaths
Labour Party (UK) MPs for English constituencies
National Labour (UK) politicians
UK MPs 1929–1931
UK MPs 1931–1935
UK MPs 1935–1945